Oud-Heverlee Leuven is a Belgian women's football club from Leuven. The club colours are white. The team plays in the national top division Super League

History
The club was founded on 1 January 2002 after a merger from the clubs Stade Leuven, Daring Club Leuven and Zwarte Duivels Oud-Heverlee.

Squad

Former players

References

Oud-Heverlee Leuven
Women
BeNe League teams
Sport in Leuven
Association football clubs established in 2002
2002 establishments in Belgium